The Dictionnaire Vivant de la Langue Française (DVLF) is a French language dictionary developed by a team at the University of Chicago's ARTFL Project through the support of a Digital Humanities Start-Up Grant from the National Endowment for the Humanities. It is an experimental approach to dictionary compilation that offers an interactive and community-oriented alternative to traditional methods of French lexicography.

It was released in beta form in January 2011. Version 2.0 was released in 2017.

References

External links
 DVLF Website
 DVLF "Mot du Jour" on Twitter
 Le Dictionnaire vivant de la langue française, un dictionnaire communautaire

French dictionaries